Max Benitz (born 14 March 1985) is an English writer, journalist, and former film and television actor.

Education
Benitz was born in London. He attended Harrow School from 1998 to 2003, where he appeared in student productions of As You Like It, Hamlet, The Pirates of Penzance, and Me and My Girl.  He completed two weeks' work experience as a filing clerk at the offices of The Spectator magazine.  After seeing his performance as Midshipman Calamy in the film Master and Commander: The Far Side of the World, Boris Johnson, then editor of the Spectator, wrote that Benitz had shown "much the same dash and dispatch [as Calamy] in rescuing my Toyota from the car pound."

Benitz went on to study history at the University of Edinburgh. As an undergraduate, he completed a nine-month programme at University of Calcutta, after which, in 2007, he embarked, with friend and fellow University of Edinburgh student George Vlasto, in a journey from Calcutta to London by car.  The trip, undertaken in a Hindustan Ambassador car, took ten weeks and covered  in a route that passed through India, Pakistan, China, Central Asia, Turkey and Europe. As a part of journey, they raised more than £12,000 for the charities Future Hope in Calcutta and Royal Marsden Hospital on behalf of disadvantaged children.

Acting career
Benitz was a teenager when acting in what may be his best known role, as Midshipman Peter Calamy in the 2003 film Master and Commander: The Far Side of the World. Still a teenager, he next appeared in a small role as Huband in the 2005 TV movie of Thomas Hughes' novel Tom Brown's Schooldays. In 2007, Benitz featured prominently as James Harrogate in the two-part episode "Sins of the Father" of the tenth series of Trial & Retribution.

After 2007, concentrating on his journalism career, Benitz, as of 2017, has only appeared in the 2014 film The Water Diviner.

Journalism
In 2008–2009, Benitz worked as an unpaid journalist for the MOBY Group and as a freelancer in Afghanistan, covering the activities of the British Army in that country. His book, Six Months Without Sundays: The Scots Guards in Afghanistan, was published by Birlinn in November 2011.

Personal life
Benitz has one son with actress Olga Kurylenko, born on 3 October 2015.

References

External links
 
 Max Benitz at Birlinn Limited

English male journalists
1985 births
Living people
People educated at Harrow School
Alumni of the University of Edinburgh
University of Calcutta alumni
English male television actors
English male film actors